Walter is a 2015 American comedy-drama film directed by Anna Mastro and starring Andrew J. West, Virginia Madsen, Milo Ventimiglia, Leven Rambin, Neve Campbell, William H. Macy, and Justin Kirk. It was released on March 13, 2015. The film is based on writer Paul Shoulberg's short film.

Plot 

Walter Gary Benjamin (Andrew J. West) works as a ticket-taker slash ticket-tearer at the local cineplex. When Walter was ten years old, he made a deal with God to judge the eternal fate of everyone he comes in contact with, in exchange for allowing his father to go to Heaven. Walter manages his daily routine and his worrisome mother until the mysterious ghost Gregory Douglas Tomlinson (Justin Kirk) shows up and forces Walter to confront the meaning of his life and his future.

Cast
 Andrew J. West as Walter Gary Benjamin
 Justin Kirk as Gregory Douglas Tomlinson
 Leven Rambin as Kendall
 Virginia Madsen as Karen Benjamin
 Neve Campbell as Allie
 William H. Macy as Dr. Donald Corman
 Milo Ventimiglia as Vince
 Peter Facinelli as Jim Benjamin
 Jim Gaffigan as Corey
 Brian J. White as Darren

References

External links

2015 comedy-drama films
2010s American films
2010s English-language films
American comedy-drama films
Films scored by Dan Romer
Films shot in Indiana